MacNamara is the surname of:

MacNamara 
 Arthur Macnamara (1831–1906), British squire and magistrate
 Brinsley MacNamara (1890–1963), Irish writer
 Caitlin Macnamara (1913–1994), British writer
 Ian McNamara (contemporary), Australian radio announcer
 James Macnamara (1768–1826), British naval officer
 Jean Macnamara (1899–1968), Australian medical scientist
 John Macnamara (1905–1944), British MP and army officer
 Stephen MacNamara (contemporary), American professor

McNamara 
 A. J. McNamara (1936–2014), judge of the U.S. District Court for the Eastern District of Louisiana
 Andrew McNamara (born 1959), Australian politician from Queensland
 Andy McNamara (born 1969), American radio sports announcer
 Barbara McNamara (born 1942), American linguist, former deputy director of the National Security Agency
 Bob McNamara (disambiguation)
 Brad McNamara (born 1965), Australian professional cricketer
 Brian McNamara (born 1960), American actor
 Conor McNamara (contemporary), Irish football commentator
 Dan McNamara (born 1984), American comedian and special effects artist
 Danny McNamara (disambiguation)
 Dave McNamara (1887–1967), Australian Rules footballer
 D. Harold McNamara (1923-2014), American astronomer
 Dinny McNamara (1905–1936), American professional baseball player and coach
 Edward H. McNamara (before 1962–2006), American politician from Wayne County, Michigan; mayor of Livonia 1970–1986
 Eileen McNamara (born 1952), American journalist, professor, and author
 Emmet McNamara (born 1990), Irish jockey
 Eugene McNamara (1930-2016), Canadian poet, author and professor
 Frank McNamara (contemporary), Irish musician
 Frank Hubert McNamara (1894–1961), Australian recipient of the Victoria Cross
 Garrett McNamara (born 1967), American surfer
 George McNamara (1886–1952), Canadian professional ice hockey player; brother of Harold and Howard McNamara
 Gerry McNamara (born 1934), Canadian professional hockey player
 Gerry McNamara (born 1983), American professional basketball player
 Greg McNamara (1950–1997), Australian professional boxer
 Harold McNamara (1889–1937), Canadian professional ice hockey player; brother of George and Howard McNamara
 Henry McNamara (1934-2018), American politician from New Jersey
 Howard McNamara (1890–1940), Canadian professional ice hockey player; brother of George and Harold McNamara
 Ian McNamara, Australian radio personality
 Jackie McNamara, Sr. (born 1952), Scottish professional footballer
 Jackie McNamara (born 1973), Scottish professional footballer and manager
 James A. McNamara, distinguished professor of orthodontics at University of Michigan Dental School
 The McNamara brothers (James and John) (fl. 1905–1941), American trade unionists, bombed the office of the Los Angeles Times 1910
 Jim McNamara (born 1965), American professional baseball player
 John McNamara (born 1950), an American artist
 John McNamara (1936-2020), a baseball manager
 John McNamara, a recipient of the Victoria Cross
 John McNamara, co-creator of Profit (TV series)
 John McNamara, one of the McNamara brothers who bombed the office of the Los Angeles Times in 1910
 John J. McNamara, banker, author, Olympic medal winner
 Joseph McNamara (disambiguation)
 Julianne McNamara (born 1965), American artistic gymnast; 1980 and 1984 Olympic contestant
 Katherine McNamara (born 1995), American actress, singer-songwriter, and dancer
 Kevin McNamara (1926–1987), Irish Roman Catholic bishop and academic; Archbishop of Dublin 1984–87
 Kevin McNamara (1934–2017), British politician and MP
 Leah McNamara, Irish actress
 Lynne McNamara (born 1944), Canadian journalist from British Columbia
 Maggie McNamara (1928–1978), American actress
 Margaret McNamara (1915–1981), American teacher; founder of Reading is Fundamental; wife of Robert S. McNamara
 Mark McNamara (born 1959), American professional basketball player
 Michael McNamara (born 1974), Irish politician; Dáil Deputy, 2011-
 Michelle McNamara (1970-2016), True crime author; wife of comedian Patton Oswalt
 Mike McNamara (born 1949), Irish hurling manager
 Neville McNamara (born 1923), Australian Air Force commander
 Noel McNamara (born 1938), Australian campaigner for victims of crime
 Pat McNamara (Australian politician) (born 1949), Australian politician from Victoria
 Patrick V. McNamara (1894–1966), American politician from Michigan; U.S. Senator 1954–66
 Percy McNamara (fl. 1908–1909), Australian rugby league player
 Peter McNamara (born 1955), Australian professional tennis player
 Richard McNamara (born 1972), English rock guitarist and drummer; brother of Danny McNamara
 Robert McNamara (1916–2009), American businessman, U.S. Secretary of Defense under John F. Kennedy and Lyndon B. Johnson; president of the World Bank
 Robert McNamara (born 1987), Australian figure skater
 Robert Craig McNamara, biologist, pedologist, businessman and farmer practicing sustainable agriculture; son of the U.S. Secretary of Defense
 Robin McNamara (born 1947), American singer, songwriter, and musician
 Sean McNamara (born 1962), American film writer, director, and producer
 Shane McNamara (contemporary), Australian television and film actor
 Shelley McNamara, Irish architect and academic founded Grafton Architects with Yvonne Farrell
 Steve McNamara (born 1971), English rugby league coach
 Tom McNamara (disambiguation)
 William McNamara (1879–1947), Canadian politician from Alberta; expelled from mayorship 1914
 William McNamara (born 1965), American actor

Fictional
Annie McNamara, character in Nip/Tuck
Julia McNamara, character in Nip/Tuck
Matt McNamara, character in Nip/Tuck
Sean McNamara, character in Nip/Tuck
Tank McNamara, titular character of the syndicated comic strip
 William McNamara, character in  Hart's War
 Heather McNamara, a character in the 1988 film Heathers, and it's musical and TV adaptations

Notes 

Lists of people by surname
Surnames